Frankfurters and Quail is a 1912 American silent short drama starring William Garwood.

External links

1912 films
1912 drama films
Thanhouser Company films
Silent American drama films
American silent short films
American black-and-white films
Films shot in New York City
1912 short films
1910s American films